Dave Nystrom is a Canadian comedian and writer who has appeared on CTV's Comedy Now!, Comedy Central, VH1 and won a Canadian Comedy Award and Writers Guild of Canada Award for his work on the CBC political comedy series This Hour Has 22 Minutes.

References

Canadian male comedians
Canadian television writers
Living people
Canadian male television writers
Canadian Comedy Award winners
Year of birth missing (living people)